A number is a mathematical object used to count, measure, and label. The original examples are the natural numbers 1, 2, 3, 4, and so forth. Numbers can be represented in language with number words. More universally, individual numbers can be represented by symbols, called numerals; for example, "5" is a numeral that represents the number five. As only a relatively small number of symbols can be memorized, basic numerals are commonly organized in a numeral system, which is an organized way to represent any number. The most common numeral system is the Hindu–Arabic numeral system, which allows for the representation of any number using a combination of ten fundamental numeric symbols, called digits. In addition to their use in counting and measuring, numerals are often used for labels (as with telephone numbers), for ordering (as with serial numbers), and for codes (as with ISBNs). In common usage, a numeral is not clearly distinguished from the number that it represents.

Calculations with numbers are done with arithmetical operations, the most familiar being addition, subtraction, multiplication, division, and exponentiation. Their study or usage is called arithmetic, a term which may also refer to number theory, the study of the properties of numbers.

Besides their practical uses, numbers have cultural significance throughout the world. For example, in Western society, the number 13 is often regarded as unlucky, and "a million" may signify "a lot" rather than an exact quantity. Though it is now regarded as pseudoscience, belief in a mystical significance of numbers, known as numerology, permeated ancient and medieval thought. Numerology heavily influenced the development of Greek mathematics, stimulating the investigation of many problems in number theory which are still of interest today.

During the 19th century, mathematicians began to develop many different abstractions which share certain properties of numbers, and may be seen as extending the concept. Among the first were the hypercomplex numbers, which consist of various extensions or modifications of the complex number system. In modern mathematics, number systems are considered important special examples of more general algebraic structures such as rings and fields, and the application of the term "number" is a matter of convention, without fundamental significance.

History

Numerals

Numbers should be distinguished from numerals, the symbols used to represent numbers. The Egyptians invented the first ciphered numeral system, and the Greeks followed by mapping their counting numbers onto Ionian and Doric alphabets. Roman numerals, a system that used combinations of letters from the Roman alphabet, remained dominant in Europe until the spread of the superior Hindu–Arabic numeral system around the late 14th century, and the Hindu–Arabic numeral system remains the most common system for representing numbers in the world today. The key to the effectiveness of the system was the symbol for zero, which was developed by ancient Indian mathematicians around 500 AD.

First use of numbers

Bones and other artifacts have been discovered with marks cut into them that many believe are tally marks. These tally marks may have been used for counting elapsed time, such as numbers of days, lunar cycles or keeping records of quantities, such as of animals.

A tallying system has no concept of place value (as in modern decimal notation), which limits its representation of large numbers. Nonetheless, tallying systems are considered the first kind of abstract numeral system.

The first known system with place value was the Mesopotamian base 60 system ( BC) and the earliest known base 10 system dates to 3100 BC in Egypt.

Zero

The first known documented use of zero dates to AD 628, and appeared in the Brāhmasphuṭasiddhānta, the main work of the Indian mathematician Brahmagupta. He treated 0 as a number and discussed operations involving it, including division. By this time (the 7th century) the concept had clearly reached Cambodia as Khmer numerals, and documentation shows the idea later spreading to China and the Islamic world.

Brahmagupta's Brāhmasphuṭasiddhānta is the first book that mentions zero as a number, hence Brahmagupta is usually considered the first to formulate the concept of zero. He gave rules of using zero with negative and positive numbers, such as "zero plus a positive number is a positive number, and a negative number plus zero is the negative number." The Brāhmasphuṭasiddhānta is the earliest known text to treat zero as a number in its own right, rather than as simply a placeholder digit in representing another number as was done by the Babylonians or as a symbol for a lack of quantity as was done by Ptolemy and the Romans.

The use of 0 as a number should be distinguished from its use as a placeholder numeral in place-value systems. Many ancient texts used 0. Babylonian and Egyptian texts used it. Egyptians used the word nfr to denote zero balance in double entry accounting. In mathematics texts this word often refers to the number zero. In a similar vein, Pāṇini (5th century BC) used the null (zero) operator in the Ashtadhyayi, an early example of an algebraic grammar for the Sanskrit language (also see Pingala).

There are other uses of zero before Brahmagupta, though the documentation is not as complete as it is in the Brāhmasphuṭasiddhānta.

Records show that the Ancient Greeks seemed unsure about the status of 0 as a number: they asked themselves "how can 'nothing' be something?" leading to interesting philosophical and, by the Medieval period, religious arguments about the nature and existence of 0 and the vacuum. The paradoxes of Zeno of Elea depend in part on the uncertain interpretation of 0. (The ancient Greeks even questioned whether  was a number.)

The late Olmec people of south-central Mexico began to use a symbol for zero, a shell glyph, in the New World, possibly by the  but certainly by 40 BC, which became an integral part of Maya numerals and the Maya calendar. Maya arithmetic used base 4 and base 5 written as base 20. George I. Sánchez in 1961 reported a base 4, base 5 "finger" abacus.

By 130 AD, Ptolemy, influenced by Hipparchus and the Babylonians, was using a symbol for 0 (a small circle with a long overbar) within a sexagesimal numeral system otherwise using alphabetic Greek numerals. Because it was used alone, not as just a placeholder, this Hellenistic zero was the first documented use of a true zero in the Old World. In later Byzantine manuscripts of his Syntaxis Mathematica (Almagest), the Hellenistic zero had morphed into the Greek letter Omicron (otherwise meaning 70).

Another true zero was used in tables alongside Roman numerals by 525 (first known use by Dionysius Exiguus), but as a word,  meaning nothing, not as a symbol. When division produced 0 as a remainder, also meaning nothing, was used. These medieval zeros were used by all future medieval computists (calculators of Easter). An isolated use of their initial, N, was used in a table of Roman numerals by Bede or a colleague about 725, a true zero symbol.

Negative numbers 

The abstract concept of negative numbers was recognized as early as 100–50 BC in China. The Nine Chapters on the Mathematical Art contains methods for finding the areas of figures; red rods were used to denote positive coefficients, black for negative. The first reference in a Western work was in the 3rd century AD in Greece.

During the 600s, negative numbers were in use in India to represent debts. Diophantus' previous reference was discussed more explicitly by Indian mathematician Brahmagupta, in Brāhmasphuṭasiddhānta in 628, who used negative numbers to produce the general form quadratic formula that remains in use today. However, in the 12th century in India, Bhaskara gives negative roots for quadratic equations but says the negative value "is in this case not to be taken, for it is inadequate; people do not approve of negative roots".

European mathematicians, for the most part, resisted the concept of negative numbers until the 17th century, although Fibonacci allowed negative solutions in financial problems where they could be interpreted as debts (chapter 13 of Liber Abaci, 1202) and later as losses (in ). René Descartes called them false roots as they cropped up in algebraic polynomials yet he found a way to swap true roots and false roots as well. At the same time, the Chinese were indicating negative numbers by drawing a diagonal stroke through the right-most non-zero digit of the corresponding positive number's numeral. The first use of negative numbers in a European work was by Nicolas Chuquet during the 15th century. He used them as exponents, but referred to them as "absurd numbers".

As recently as the 18th century, it was common practice to ignore any negative results returned by equations on the assumption that they were meaningless.

Rational numbers 
It is likely that the concept of fractional numbers dates to prehistoric times. The Ancient Egyptians used their Egyptian fraction notation for rational numbers in mathematical texts such as the Rhind Mathematical Papyrus and the Kahun Papyrus. Classical Greek and Indian mathematicians made studies of the theory of rational numbers, as part of the general study of number theory. The best known of these is Euclid's Elements, dating to roughly 300 BC. Of the Indian texts, the most relevant is the Sthananga Sutra, which also covers number theory as part of a general study of mathematics.

The concept of decimal fractions is closely linked with decimal place-value notation; the two seem to have developed in tandem. For example, it is common for the Jain math sutra to include calculations of decimal-fraction approximations to pi or the square root of 2. Similarly, Babylonian math texts used sexagesimal (base 60) fractions with great frequency.

Irrational numbers 

The earliest known use of irrational numbers was in the Indian Sulba Sutras composed between 800 and 500 BC. The first existence proofs of irrational numbers is usually attributed to Pythagoras, more specifically to the Pythagorean Hippasus of Metapontum, who produced a (most likely geometrical) proof of the irrationality of the square root of 2. The story goes that Hippasus discovered irrational numbers when trying to represent the square root of 2 as a fraction. However, Pythagoras believed in the absoluteness of numbers, and could not accept the existence of irrational numbers. He could not disprove their existence through logic, but he could not accept irrational numbers, and so, allegedly and frequently reported, he sentenced Hippasus to death by drowning, to impede spreading of this disconcerting news.

The 16th century brought final European acceptance of negative integral and fractional numbers. By the 17th  century, mathematicians generally used decimal fractions with modern notation. It was not, however, until the 19th century that mathematicians separated irrationals into algebraic and transcendental parts, and once more undertook the scientific study of irrationals. It had remained almost dormant since Euclid. In 1872, the publication of the theories of Karl Weierstrass (by his pupil E. Kossak), Eduard Heine, Georg Cantor, and Richard Dedekind was brought about. In 1869, Charles Méray had taken the same point of departure as Heine, but the theory is generally referred to the year 1872. Weierstrass's method was completely set forth by Salvatore Pincherle (1880), and Dedekind's has received additional prominence through the author's later work (1888) and endorsement by Paul Tannery (1894). Weierstrass, Cantor, and Heine base their theories on infinite series, while Dedekind founds his on the idea of a cut (Schnitt) in the system of real numbers, separating all rational numbers into two groups having certain characteristic properties. The subject has received later contributions at the hands of Weierstrass, Kronecker, and Méray.

The search for roots of quintic and higher degree equations was an important development, the Abel–Ruffini theorem (Ruffini 1799, Abel 1824) showed that they could not be solved by radicals (formulas involving only arithmetical operations and roots). Hence it was necessary to consider the wider set of algebraic numbers (all solutions to polynomial equations). Galois (1832) linked polynomial equations to group theory giving rise to the field of Galois theory.

Continued fractions, closely related to irrational numbers (and due to Cataldi, 1613), received attention at the hands of Euler, and at the opening of the 19th century were brought into prominence through the writings of Joseph Louis Lagrange. Other noteworthy contributions have been made by Druckenmüller (1837), Kunze (1857), Lemke (1870), and Günther (1872).

Transcendental numbers and reals 

The existence of transcendental numbers was first established by Liouville (1844, 1851). Hermite proved in 1873 that e is transcendental and Lindemann proved in 1882 that π is transcendental. Finally, Cantor showed that the set of all real numbers is uncountably infinite but the set of all algebraic numbers is countably infinite, so there is an uncountably infinite number of transcendental numbers.

Infinity and infinitesimals 

The earliest known conception of mathematical infinity appears in the Yajur Veda, an ancient Indian script, which at one point states, "If you remove a part from infinity or add a part to infinity, still what remains is infinity." Infinity was a popular topic of philosophical study among the Jain mathematicians c. 400 BC. They distinguished between five types of infinity: infinite in one and two directions, infinite in area, infinite everywhere, and infinite perpetually. The symbol  is often used to represent an infinite quantity.

Aristotle defined the traditional Western notion of mathematical infinity. He distinguished between actual infinity and potential infinity—the general consensus being that only the latter had true value. Galileo Galilei's Two New Sciences discussed the idea of one-to-one correspondences between infinite sets. But the next major advance in the theory was made by Georg Cantor; in 1895 he published a book about his new set theory, introducing, among other things, transfinite numbers and formulating the continuum hypothesis.

In the 1960s, Abraham Robinson showed how infinitely large and infinitesimal numbers can be rigorously defined and used to develop the field of nonstandard analysis. The system of hyperreal numbers represents a rigorous method of treating the ideas about infinite and infinitesimal numbers that had been used casually by mathematicians, scientists, and engineers ever since the invention of infinitesimal calculus by Newton and Leibniz.

A modern geometrical version of infinity is given by projective geometry, which introduces "ideal points at infinity", one for each spatial direction. Each family of parallel lines in a given direction is postulated to converge to the corresponding ideal point. This is closely related to the idea of vanishing points in perspective drawing.

Complex numbers 

They became more prominent when in the 16th century closed formulas for the roots of third and fourth degree polynomials were discovered by Italian mathematicians such as Niccolò Fontana Tartaglia and Gerolamo Cardano. It was soon realized that these formulas, even if one was only interested in real solutions, sometimes required the manipulation of square roots of negative numbers.

This was doubly unsettling since they did not even consider negative numbers to be on firm ground at the time. When René Descartes coined the term "imaginary" for these quantities in 1637, he intended it as derogatory. (See imaginary number for a discussion of the "reality" of complex numbers.) A further source of confusion was that the equation

seemed capriciously inconsistent with the algebraic identity

which is valid for positive real numbers a and b, and was also used in complex number calculations with one of a, b positive and the other negative. The incorrect use of this identity, and the related identity

in the case when both a and b are negative even bedeviled Euler.

The 18th century saw the work of Abraham de Moivre and Leonhard Euler. De Moivre's formula (1730) states:

while Euler's formula of complex analysis (1748) gave us:

The existence of complex numbers was not completely accepted until Caspar Wessel described the geometrical interpretation in 1799. Carl Friedrich Gauss rediscovered and popularized it several years later, and as a result the theory of complex numbers received a notable expansion. The idea of the graphic representation of complex numbers had appeared, however, as early as 1685, in Wallis's De algebra tractatus.

In the same year, Gauss provided the first generally accepted proof of the fundamental theorem of algebra, showing that every polynomial over the complex numbers has a full set of solutions in that realm. Gauss studied complex numbers of the form , where a and b are integers (now called Gaussian integers) or rational numbers. Other such classes (called cyclotomic fields) of complex numbers derive from the roots of unity  for higher values of k. This generalization is largely due to Ernst Kummer, who also invented ideal numbers, which were expressed as geometrical entities by Felix Klein in 1893.

In 1850 Victor Alexandre Puiseux took the key step of distinguishing between poles and branch points, and introduced the concept of essential singular points. This eventually led to the concept of the extended complex plane.

Prime numbers 
Prime numbers have been studied throughout recorded history. Euclid devoted one book of the Elements to the theory of primes; in it he proved the infinitude of the primes and the fundamental theorem of arithmetic, and presented the Euclidean algorithm for finding the greatest common divisor of two numbers.

In 240 BC, Eratosthenes used the Sieve of Eratosthenes to quickly isolate prime numbers. But most further development of the theory of primes in Europe dates to the Renaissance and later eras.

In 1796, Adrien-Marie Legendre conjectured the prime number theorem, describing the asymptotic distribution of primes. Other results concerning the distribution of the primes include Euler's proof that the sum of the reciprocals of the primes diverges, and the Goldbach conjecture, which claims that any sufficiently large even number is the sum of two primes. Yet another conjecture related to the distribution of prime numbers is the Riemann hypothesis, formulated by Bernhard Riemann in 1859. The prime number theorem was finally proved by Jacques Hadamard and Charles de la Vallée-Poussin in 1896. Goldbach and Riemann's conjectures remain unproven and unrefuted.

Main classification

Numbers can be classified into sets, called number sets or number systems, such as the natural numbers and the real numbers. The main number systems are as follows:

Each of these number system is a subset of the next one. So, for example, a rational number is also a real number, and every real number is also a complex number. This can be expressed symbolically as
.

A more complete list of number sets appears in the following diagram.

Natural numbers

The most familiar numbers are the natural numbers (sometimes called whole numbers or counting numbers): 1, 2, 3, and so on. Traditionally, the sequence of natural numbers started with 1 (0 was not even considered a number for the Ancient Greeks.) However, in the 19th century, set theorists and other mathematicians started including 0 (cardinality of the empty set, i.e. 0 elements, where 0 is thus the smallest cardinal number) in the set of natural numbers. Today, different mathematicians use the term to describe both sets, including 0 or not. The mathematical symbol for the set of all natural numbers is N, also written , and sometimes  or  when it is necessary to indicate whether the set should start with 0 or 1, respectively.

In the base 10 numeral system, in almost universal use today for mathematical operations, the symbols for natural numbers are written using ten digits: 0, 1, 2, 3, 4, 5, 6, 7, 8, and 9. The radix or base is the number of unique numerical digits, including zero, that a numeral system uses to represent numbers (for the decimal system, the radix is 10). In this base 10 system, the rightmost digit of a natural number has a place value of 1, and every other digit has a place value ten times that of the place value of the digit to its right.

In set theory, which is capable of acting as an axiomatic foundation for modern mathematics, natural numbers can be represented by classes of equivalent sets. For instance, the number 3 can be represented as the class of all sets that have exactly three elements. Alternatively, in Peano Arithmetic, the number 3 is represented as sss0, where s is the "successor" function (i.e., 3 is the third successor of 0). Many different representations are possible; all that is needed to formally represent 3 is to inscribe a certain symbol or pattern of symbols three times.

Integers

The negative of a positive integer is defined as a number that produces 0 when it is added to the corresponding positive integer. Negative numbers are usually written with a negative sign (a minus sign). When the set of negative numbers is combined with the set of natural numbers (including 0), the result is defined as the set of integers, Z also written . Here the letter Z comes . The set of integers forms a ring with the operations addition and multiplication.

The natural numbers form a subset of the integers. As there is no common standard for the inclusion or not of zero in the natural numbers, the natural numbers without zero are commonly referred to as positive integers, and the natural numbers with zero are referred to as non-negative integers.

Rational numbers

A rational number is a number that can be expressed as a fraction with an integer numerator and a positive integer denominator. Negative denominators are allowed, but are commonly avoided, as every rational number is equal to a fraction with positive denominator. Fractions are written as two integers, the numerator and the denominator, with a dividing bar between them. The fraction  represents m parts of a whole divided into n equal parts.

In general,
 if and only if 

If the absolute value of m is greater than n (supposed to be positive), then the absolute value of the fraction is greater than 1. Fractions can be greater than, less than, or equal to 1 and can also be positive, negative, or 0. The set of all rational numbers includes the integers since every integer can be written as a fraction with denominator 1. For example −7 can be written . The symbol for the rational numbers is Q (for quotient), also written .

Real numbers

The symbol for the real numbers is R, also written as  They include all the measuring numbers. Every real number corresponds to a point on the number line. The following paragraph will focus primarily on positive real numbers. The treatment of negative real numbers is according to the general rules of arithmetic and their denotation is simply prefixing the corresponding positive numeral by a minus sign, e.g. −123.456.

Most real numbers can only be approximated by decimal numerals, in which a decimal point is placed to the right of the digit with place value 1. Each digit to the right of the decimal point has a place value one-tenth of the place value of the digit to its left. For example, 123.456 represents , or, in words, one hundred, two tens, three ones, four tenths, five hundredths, and six thousandths. A real number can be expressed by a finite number of decimal digits only if it is rational and its fractional part has a denominator whose prime factors are 2 or 5 or both, because these are the prime factors of 10, the base of the decimal system. Thus, for example, one half is 0.5, one fifth is 0.2, one-tenth is 0.1, and one fiftieth is 0.02. Representing other real numbers as decimals would require an infinite sequence of digits to the right of the decimal point. If this infinite sequence of digits follows a pattern, it can be written with an ellipsis or another notation that indicates the repeating pattern. Such a decimal is called a repeating decimal. Thus  can be written as 0.333..., with an ellipsis to indicate that the pattern continues. Forever repeating 3s are also written as 0..

It turns out that these repeating decimals (including the repetition of zeroes) denote exactly the rational numbers, i.e., all rational numbers are also real numbers, but it is not the case that every real number is rational. A real number that is not rational is called irrational. When pi is written as

as it sometimes is, the ellipsis does not mean that the decimals repeat (they do not), but rather that there is no end to them. It has been proved that  is irrational. Another well-known number, proven to be an irrational real number, is

the square root of 2, that is, the unique positive real number whose square is 2. Both these numbers have been approximated (by computer) to trillions  of digits.

Not only these prominent examples but almost all real numbers are irrational and therefore have no repeating patterns and hence no corresponding decimal numeral. They can only be approximated by decimal numerals, denoting rounded or truncated real numbers. Any rounded or truncated number is necessarily a rational number, of which there are only countably many. All measurements are, by their nature, approximations, and always have a margin of error. Digits that suggest a greater accuracy than the measurement itself does, should be removed. The remaining digits are then called significant digits. For example, measurements with a ruler can seldom be made without a margin of error of at least 0.001 m. Since not even the second digit after the decimal place is preserved, the following digits are not significant. Therefore, the result is usually rounded to 5.61.

Just as the same fraction can be written in more than one way, the same real number may have more than one decimal representation. For example, 0.999..., 1.0, 1.00, 1.000, ..., all represent the natural number 1. A given real number has only the following decimal representations: an approximation to some finite number of decimal places, an approximation in which a pattern is established that continues for an unlimited number of decimal places or an exact value with only finitely many decimal places. In this last case, the last non-zero digit may be replaced by the digit one smaller followed by an unlimited number of 9's, or the last non-zero digit may be followed by an unlimited number of zeros. Thus the exact real number 3.74 can also be written 3.7399999999... and 3.74000000000.... Similarly, a decimal numeral with an unlimited number of 0's can be rewritten by dropping the 0's to the right of the rightmost nonzero digit, and a decimal numeral with an unlimited number of 9's can be rewritten by increasing by one the rightmost digit less than 9, and changing all the 9's to the right of that digit to 0's. Finally, an unlimited sequence of 0's to the right of a decimal place can be dropped. For example, 6.849999999999... = 6.85 and 6.850000000000... = 6.85. Finally, if all of the digits in a numeral are 0, the number is 0, and if all of the digits in a numeral are an unending string of 9's, you can drop the nines to the right of the decimal place, and add one to the string of 9s to the left of the decimal place. For example, 99.999... = 100.

The real numbers also have an important but highly technical property called the least upper bound property.

It can be shown that any ordered field, which is also complete, is isomorphic to the real numbers. The real numbers are not, however, an algebraically closed field, because they do not include a solution (often called a square root of minus one) to the algebraic equation .

Complex numbers

Moving to a greater level of abstraction, the real numbers can be extended to the complex numbers. This set of numbers arose historically from trying to find closed formulas for the roots of cubic and quadratic polynomials. This led to expressions involving the square roots of negative numbers, and eventually to the definition of a new number: a square root of −1, denoted by i, a symbol assigned by Leonhard Euler, and called the imaginary unit. The complex numbers consist of all numbers of the form

where a and b are real numbers. Because of this, complex numbers correspond to points on the complex plane, a vector space of two real dimensions. In the expression , the real number a is called the real part and b is called the imaginary part. If the real part of a complex number is 0, then the number is called an imaginary number or is referred to as purely imaginary; if the imaginary part is 0, then the number is a real number. Thus the real numbers are a subset of the complex numbers. If the real and imaginary parts of a complex number are both integers, then the number is called a Gaussian integer.

The fundamental theorem of algebra asserts that the complex numbers form an algebraically closed field, meaning that every polynomial with complex coefficients has a root in the complex numbers. Like the reals, the complex numbers form a field, which is complete, but unlike the real numbers, it is not ordered. That is, there is no consistent meaning assignable to saying that i is greater than 1, nor is there any meaning in saying that i is less than 1. In technical terms, the complex numbers lack a total order that is compatible with field operations.

Subclasses of the integers

Even and odd numbers

An even number is an integer that is "evenly divisible" by two, that is divisible by two without remainder; an odd number is an integer that is not even. (The old-fashioned term "evenly divisible" is now almost always shortened to "divisible".) Any odd number n may be constructed by the formula  for a suitable integer k. Starting with  the first non-negative odd numbers are {1, 3, 5, 7, ...}. Any even number m has the form  where k is again an integer. Similarly, the first non-negative even numbers are {0, 2, 4, 6, ...}.

Prime numbers

A prime number, often shortened to just prime, is an integer greater than 1 that is not the product of two smaller positive integers. The first few prime numbers are 2, 3, 5, 7, and 11. There is no such simple formula as for odd and even numbers to generate the prime numbers. The primes have been widely studied for more than 2000 years and have led to many questions, only some of which have been answered. The study of these questions belongs to number theory. Goldbach's conjecture is an example of a still unanswered question: "Is every even number the sum of two primes?"

One answered question, as to whether every integer greater than one is a product of primes in only one way, except for a rearrangement of the primes, was confirmed; this proven claim is called the fundamental theorem of arithmetic. A proof appears in Euclid's Elements.

Other classes of integers
Many subsets of the natural numbers have been the subject of specific studies and have been named, often after the first mathematician that has studied them. Example of such sets of integers are Fibonacci numbers and perfect numbers. For more examples, see Integer sequence.

Subclasses of the complex numbers

Algebraic, irrational and transcendental numbers
Algebraic numbers are those that are a solution to a polynomial equation with integer coefficients. Real numbers that are not rational numbers are called irrational numbers. Complex numbers which are not algebraic are called transcendental numbers. The algebraic numbers that are solutions of a monic polynomial equation with integer coefficients are called algebraic integers.

Constructible numbers
Motivated by the classical problems of constructions with straightedge and compass, the constructible numbers are those complex numbers whose real and imaginary parts can be constructed using straightedge and compass, starting from a given segment of unit length, in a finite number of steps.

Computable numbers

A computable number, also known as recursive number, is a real number such that there exists an algorithm which, given a positive number n as input, produces the first n digits of the computable number's decimal representation. Equivalent definitions can be given using μ-recursive functions, Turing machines or λ-calculus. The computable numbers are stable for all usual arithmetic operations, including the computation of the roots of a polynomial, and thus form a real closed field that contains the real algebraic numbers.

The computable numbers may be viewed as the real numbers that may be exactly represented in a computer: a computable number is exactly represented by its first digits and a program for computing further digits. However, the computable numbers are rarely used in practice. One reason is that there is no algorithm for testing the equality of two computable numbers. More precisely, there cannot exist any algorithm which takes any computable number as an input, and decides in every case if this number is equal to zero or not.

The set of computable numbers has the same cardinality as the natural numbers. Therefore, almost all real numbers are non-computable. However, it is very difficult to produce explicitly a real number that is not computable.

Extensions of the concept

p-adic numbers

The p-adic numbers may have infinitely long expansions to the left of the decimal point, in the same way that real numbers may have infinitely long expansions to the right. The number system that results depends on what base is used for the digits: any base is possible, but a prime number base provides the best mathematical properties. The set of the p-adic numbers contains the rational numbers, but is not contained in the complex numbers.

The elements of an algebraic function field over a finite field and algebraic numbers have many similar properties (see Function field analogy). Therefore, they are often regarded as numbers by number theorists. The p-adic numbers play an important role in this analogy.

Hypercomplex numbers

Some number systems that are not included in the complex numbers may be constructed from the real numbers in a way that generalize the construction of the complex numbers. They are sometimes called hypercomplex numbers. They include the quaternions H, introduced by Sir William Rowan Hamilton, in which multiplication is not commutative, the octonions, in which multiplication is not associative in addition to not being commutative, and the sedenions, in which multiplication is not alternative, neither associative nor commutative.

Transfinite numbers

For dealing with infinite sets, the natural numbers have been generalized to the ordinal numbers and to the cardinal numbers. The former gives the ordering of the set, while the latter gives its size. For finite sets, both ordinal and cardinal numbers are identified with the natural numbers. In the infinite case, many ordinal numbers correspond to the same cardinal number.

Nonstandard numbers
Hyperreal numbers are used in non-standard analysis. The hyperreals, or nonstandard reals (usually denoted as *R), denote an ordered field that is a proper extension of the ordered field of real numbers R and satisfies the transfer principle. This principle allows true first-order statements about R to be reinterpreted as true first-order statements about *R.

Superreal and surreal numbers extend the real numbers by adding infinitesimally small numbers and infinitely large numbers, but still form fields.

See also

 Concrete number
 List of numbers
 List of types of numbers
 
 Complex numbers
 Numerical cognition
 Orders of magnitude
 
 
 
 
 
 Subitizing and counting

Notes

References
 Tobias Dantzig, Number, the language of science; a critical survey written for the cultured non-mathematician, New York, The Macmillan Company, 1930.
 Erich Friedman, What's special about this number? 
 Steven Galovich, Introduction to Mathematical Structures, Harcourt Brace Javanovich, 1989, .
 Paul Halmos, Naive Set Theory, Springer, 1974, .
 Morris Kline, Mathematical Thought from Ancient to Modern Times, Oxford University Press, 1990. 
 Alfred North Whitehead and Bertrand Russell, Principia Mathematica to *56, Cambridge University Press, 1910.
 Leo Cory, A Brief History of Numbers, Oxford University Press, 2015, .

External links

; 
Online Encyclopedia of Integer Sequences

Group theory
 
Mathematical objects